Babu Banarasi Das Indoor Stadium is an indoor sports venue in Lucknow, Uttar Pradesh. It is commonly used for the indoor sports including Kabbadi, Badminton and Table Tennis.

Home team 

Awadhe Warriors is a badminton team who is based at the stadium and is owned by Sahara Adventure Sports Limited a group company of Sahara India  for the Indian Badminton League. 

It's also the home ground for UP Yoddha a Pro Kabaddi 2017 team.

Events
 2012 India Open Grand Prix Gold
 2013 Indian Badminton League
 2014 India Open Grand Prix Gold
 2014 Indian Badminton League
 2015 India Open Grand Prix Gold
 2017 Pro Kabaddi League season
 2017 Syed Modi International Badminton Championships

References

Indoor arenas in India
Sports venues in Lucknow
Sports venues completed in 2013
2013 establishments in Uttar Pradesh